Same'a District is a district of the Taiz Governorate, Yemen. As of 2003, the district had a population of 41,464 inhabitants.

Location

It is located in the southern part of Taiz governorate. It is bordered by Dimnat Khadir to the north, Al-Mawasit to the south, As Silw to the east and Al-Ma'afer to the west.

Uzaal and villages of Same'a district 
Rural districts in Yemen are divided into 'Uzaal while Uzaal are divided into villages. There is only one Uzlah in Same'a district.

Uzlat Same'a
Horat Markaz Al-mudiria village. 
Al-thija' village. 
Al-wasita village.
Bakian village.
Nahman village.
Hawra village.
Al-khadra' village.
'Adhan village.
Al-salaf village.
Sarabit 'Uela(upper Sarabit) village.
Sarabit Asfal(lower Sarabit) village.
Mawqieih village.
Qa'an village.
Al-madhabah village.
Al-kharayib village.
Al-jiba village.
Al-diya' village.
Al-akym village.
Al-mayasin village.
Al-bals village.
Mushrifa village.
Damnat Same'a village.
Al-birah village.
Al-rahiuh village.
Al-najid village.
Harur village.
Hamaan village.
Bani Tamim village.
Al-khanf village.
Dhi Qatish village.
Al-qatb village.
Al-muhirib village.
Hafarat village.
'Aridat Shari' village.
'Arajish village.

References

Districts of Taiz Governorate